The Asia/Oceania Zone was one of three zones of regional competition in the 2015 Fed Cup.

Group I 
Venue: Guangdong Olympic Tennis Centre, Guangzhou, China (outdoor hard)
Dates: 4–7 February

Pools

Play-offs 

 was promoted to World Group II play-offs
 was relegated to Asia/Oceania Zone Group II in 2016

Group II 
 Venue: SAAP Tennis Complex, Hyderabad, India (outdoor hard)
 Dates: 14–18 April

Pools

Play-offs

1st to 4th playoffs

5th to 10th playoffs

Final placements 

  advanced to Asia/Oceania Zone Group I in 2016.

References 

 Fed Cup Result, 2015 Asia/Oceania Group I
 Fed Cup Result, 2015 Asia/Oceania Group II

External links 
 Fed Cup website

 
Asia Oceania
Tennis tournaments in China
Tennis tournaments in India